Rasopone is genus of ants in the subfamily Ponerinae. The genus is restricted to Central and South America.

Species

Rasopone arhuaca (Forel, 1901)
Rasopone becculata MacKay & MacKay, 2010
Rasopone breviscapa MacKay & MacKay, 2010
Rasopone cernua MacKay & MacKay, 2010
Rasopone conicula MacKay & MacKay, 2010
Rasopone ferruginea (Smith, 1858)
Rasopone longidentata MacKay & MacKay, 2010
Rasopone lunaris (Emery, 1896)
Rasopone minuta (MacKay & MacKay, 2010)
Rasopone pergandei (Forel, 1909)
Rasopone rupinicola MacKay & MacKay, 2010

References

Ponerinae
Ant genera
Hymenoptera of North America
Hymenoptera of South America